Auguste Bouché-Leclercq (30 July 1842 – 19 July 1923) was a French historian.

Life 

Auguste Bouché-Leclercq was born in 1842 at Francières, Oise as son of Louis-Thomas Bouché and Marie-Joséphine Leclercq. His parents were farmers. He was educated at seminaries and took his school-leaving exam in 1861 in Paris. Later he travelled as private tutor several months through Italian and German cities. In 1866 he was grammar school teacher at Meaux. In 1872 he received his doctorate in philosophy and was from 1873-1878 professor of ancient literature at the philosophical faculty of Montpellier. In 1876 he married Marie Julie Guillaume and had with her three sons and one daughter. He became professor of ancient history in Paris in 1887, member of the Académie des Inscriptions et Belles-Lettres in 1898 and officer of the Legion of Honour in 1903. He retired in 1918 and died in 1923 at Nogent-sur-Marne.

Bouché-Leclercq’s research centred on the ancient history of religion and the history of Hellenism. He wrote important works about the Ptolemaic dynasty and the Seleucid Empire and translated the works of German historians into French, for example, 1883-1885 the Geschichte des Hellenismus by Johann Gustav Droysen.

Works (incomplete)
1871 Les pontifes de l’ancienne Rome (thesis)
1879 Histoire de la divination dans l'antiquité
1883 Histoire grecque 
1886 Manuel des institutions romaines 
1888 Histoire de la Grèce sous la domination des romains
1899 L’astrologie grecque
1900 Leçons d’histoire grecque 
1903 Histoire des Lagides 
1913 Histoire des Séleucides (323-64 avant J.-C.)

References 
 M. Prévost: Bouché-Leclercq, Auguste. In: Dictionnaire de Biographie française, vol. 6 (1954), col. 1195.

External links
Historians of Astrology - by Lester Ness (Changchun University of Technology) at cura.free.fr

People from Oise
1842 births
1923 deaths
Academic staff of the University of Montpellier
19th-century French historians
20th-century French historians
French scholars of Roman history
Members of the Académie des Inscriptions et Belles-Lettres
Officers of the Order of Saints Maurice and Lazarus
Officiers of the Légion d'honneur
French hellenists
Academic staff of the University of Paris